Wasekamio Lake is a glacial lake in northern Saskatchewan. It is part of a series of connected lakes that flow south into the Churchill River drainage system. These lakes from north to south are Wasekamio Lake, Turnor Lake, Frobisher Lake, and Churchill Lake. Just north of Wasekamio Lake is the Clearwater River that flows west to the Athabasca River.

Fish species 
The lake's fish species include: walleye, sauger, yellow perch, northern pike, lake trout, lake whitefish, cisco, white sucker, longnose sucker, and burbot.

See also 
List of lakes of Saskatchewan

References 

Lakes of Saskatchewan